Our Lady Seat of Wisdom College may refer to the following educational institutions:

 Our Lady Seat of Wisdom College (Cameroon), a private secondary-level Catholic boarding school located in Fontem, Cameroon.
 Our Lady Seat of Wisdom College (Canada), a private Catholic liberal arts college located in Barry's Bay, Ontario.